Hôtel de France is a 1987 French drama film directed by Patrice Chéreau. It was screened in the Un Certain Regard section at the 1987 Cannes Film Festival.

Cast
 Laurent Grévill - Michel
 Valeria Bruni Tedeschi - Sonia
 Vincent Perez - Serge
 Laura Benson - Anna
 Thibault de Montalembert - Nicolas
 Marc Citti - Philippe Galtier
 Bernard Nissile - Richard Veninger
 Marianne Denicourt - Catherine
 Isabelle Renauld - Marie
 Bruno Todeschini - Bouguereau
 Agnès Jaoui - Mme Bouguereau
 Hélène de Saint-Père - Mme Petitjean
 Thierry Ravel - Manu
 Dominic Gould - Le compagnon de Manu
 Foued Nassah - Le compagnon de Manu
 Franck Demules - Le serveur

References

External links

1987 films
1987 drama films
French drama films
1980s French-language films
Films directed by Patrice Chéreau
Films produced by Claude Berri
1980s French films